Murat Mukhamedovich Yemkuzhev (born 1 April 1984) is a former Russian professional football player.

Club career
He made his debut for PFC Spartak Nalchik on 20 September 2006 in a Russian Cup game against FC Sibir Novosibirsk.

He played in the Russian Football National League for FC Chernomorets Novorossiysk in 2009.

External links
 

1984 births
Living people
Russian footballers
Association football defenders
FC Spartak-UGP Anapa players
PFC Spartak Nalchik players
FC Sheksna Cherepovets players
FC Chernomorets Novorossiysk players
FC Oryol players